Binoy Mathew (born 23 November 1972) is an Indian ad film maker. He has directed  advertising commercials for various brands in India.

Early life and education
Binoy was born in the village of Kadampanad, Kerala . He studied at  Infant Jesus School, Thuvayoor, Boys High School, Kadampanad, Devasom Board College, Sasthamcotta (Bsc, Physics) and  Rourkela Institute of management Studies (MBA). He gained experience in advertising and marketing while working with  Sintex Industries Ltd., MK Electric Ltd., Schneider Electric Ltd., WaterMelon Studios Private Ltd. and  Magiclite Productions.

Career
Binoy started directing commercials with the IDCB  Vanitha Easy Loan campaign and has worked on various brands  He also directed two animations shorts titled The Stealth and Walk and Talk.  The Stealth was selected for the prestigious Athens Anim Fest 2009. The premiere of the short film Walk and Talk  took place at The Third International Documentary and Short Film Festival of Kerala  (idsffk), 2010, in the competition section of animation films.

References

External links
 YOUTUBE channel of Binoy Mathew
 Kanthi-Mada Cartoon Page
 Short Stories Page

1972 births
Living people
21st-century Indian film directors
Film directors from Kerala
Indian writers